Players and pairs who neither have high enough rankings nor receive wild cards may participate in a qualifying tournament held one week before the annual Wimbledon Tennis Championships.

Seeds

  Sébastien Lareau (first round)
  Dick Norman (second round)
 n/a
  Daniel Nestor (qualified)
  Anders Järryd (qualifying competition, lucky loser)
  Leander Paes (qualifying competition, lucky loser)
  Jared Palmer (qualified)
  Laurence Tieleman (first round)
  Andrew Ilie (qualified)
  David Nainkin (qualifying competition, lucky loser)
  Diego Nargiso (qualified)
  Wayne Black (first round)
  Jörn Renzenbrink (qualified)
  Tuomas Ketola (first round)
  Thierry Champion (qualified)
  Andrei Pavel (first round)
  Vincenzo Santopadre (first round)
  Albert Chang (qualifying competition, lucky loser)
  Arne Thoms (qualifying competition)
  Hendrik Jan Davids (first round)
  Thierry Guardiola (second round)
  Peter Tramacchi (qualified)
  Daniel Courcol (first round)
  Sander Groen (first round)
  Steve Bryan (qualifying competition)
  James Sekulov (second round)
  Noam Behr (first round)
  Neville Godwin (qualified)
  Bill Behrens (second round)
  Martín Rodríguez (second round)
  Todd Larkham (first round)
  Jim Grabb (qualified)

Qualifiers

  Jim Grabb
  Stéphane Huet
  Tom Kempers
  Daniel Nestor
  Doug Flach
  Neville Godwin
  Jared Palmer
  Pierre Bouteyre
  Andrew Ilie
  Alex O'Brien
  Diego Nargiso
  Peter Tramacchi
  Jörn Renzenbrink
  Lorenzo Manta
  Thierry Champion
  Mosé Navarra

Lucky losers

  Anders Järryd
  Leander Paes
  David Nainkin
  Albert Chang

Qualifying draw

First qualifier

Second qualifier

Third qualifier

Fourth qualifier

Fifth qualifier

Sixth qualifier

Seventh qualifier

Eighth qualifier

Ninth qualifier

Tenth qualifier

Eleventh qualifier

Twelfth qualifier

Thirteenth qualifier

Fourteenth qualifier

Fifteenth qualifier

Sixteenth qualifier

External links

 1996 Wimbledon Championships – Men's draws and results at the International Tennis Federation

Men's Singles Qualifying
Wimbledon Championship by year – Men's singles qualifying